Laguna de Ipala is a crater lake in Guatemala.

References

Ipala
Ipala
Geography of the Chiquimula Department